Guo Feng may refer to:

National Customs, or Guo Feng, 1935 Chinese film 
Kwok Fung (born 1951), or Guo Feng, Hong Kong actor
Guo Feng (politician) (郭峰; 1915–2005), Chinese politician
Guo Feng (singer) (郭峰; born 1962), Chinese singer